Team rosters for the women's basketball tournament at the 2011 Pan American Games in Guadalajara, Mexico.

Puerto Rico 

The Puerto Rico women's national basketball team roster for the 2011 Pan American Games.

Mexico 

The Mexico women's national basketball team roster for the 2011 Pan American Games.

Brazil 

The Brazil women's national basketball team roster for the 2011 Pan American Games.

Colombia 

The Colombia women's national basketball team roster for the 2011 Pan American Games.

Argentina 

The Argentina women's national basketball team roster for the 2011 Pan American Games.

Canada 

The Canada women's national basketball team roster for the 2011 Pan American Games.

United States 

The United States women's national basketball team roster for the 2011 Pan American Games.

Jamaica 

The Jamaica women's national basketball team roster for the 2011 Pan American Games.

References 

Team squads at the 2011 Pan American Games
Basketball squads at the Pan American Games
Basketball at the 2011 Pan American Games – Women's tournament